"We Remain" is a song by American singer Christina Aguilera, taken from The Hunger Games: Catching Fire – Original Motion Picture Soundtrack, the soundtrack to the 2013 American science-fiction adventure film The Hunger Games: Catching Fire. It was released as the third single from the soundtrack on October 1, 2013, following Coldplay's "Atlas" and Sia's "Elastic Heart". Composed by Ryan Tedder, Brent Kutzle and Mikky Ekko, "We Remain" is an arena pop power ballad about perseverance. Contemporary music critics lauded the song for its sound and picked it as one of the highlights from the soundtrack. The single appeared on a few national record charts including Belgium, South Korea and the United Kingdom.

Background
Following the release of her seventh studio album, Lotus (2012), which spawned two singles "Your Body" and "Just a Fool", Aguilera was reported to be featured on the soundtrack for The Hunger Games: Catching Fire Original Motion Picture Soundtrack with a song called "We Remain" in September 2013. On September 25, 2013, Aguilera unveiled a 90-second preview of the track.

Composition

"We Remain" was written by Ryan Tedder and Brent Kutzle of OneRepublic, and Mikky Ekko. The song is a midtempo arena pop power ballad. Aguilera sings with "enormous" and "soaring" vocals on a "propulsive Ryan Tedder-ish beat" background. "We Remain" incorporates a smooth piano and drum machine in its instrumentation. According to Billboard magazine, the ballad "finds [Aguilera] tamping down [...] for a natural and forceful message of perseverance". At the chorus, Aguilera sings "So burn me with fire/ Drown me with rain/ I'm gonna wake up screaming your name/ Yes I'm a sinner, yes I'm a saint/ whatever happens here, whatever happens here, we remain". Several critics compared "We Remain" to Aguilera's previous hit "Beautiful" (2002) and Alicia Keys' "Girl on Fire" (2012) for musical similarities.

Release history
The song was released as the third single from the soundtrack, following "Atlas" by Coldplay and "Elastic Heart" by Sia. It was released as a digital download single at Amazon.com on October 1, 2013. It was also released on the iTunes Stores on the same day. On October 8, "We Remain" impacted US contemporary hit radio. Aguilera performed "We Remain" live with her contestant Jacquie Lee during the season finale of the fifth season of The Voice on December 17, 2013. A studio version of the duet was released on the US iTunes Store on December 16, 2013.

Critical reception
"We Remain" received critical acclaim from music critics. Ryan Reed from Rolling Stone magazine praised the "triumphant sounding" track "sure to be a hit at District 12 radio". An editor from The Huffington Post picked "We Remain" as one of the standout tracks from the soundtrack that "encapsulates the spirit and power of Games''' heroine, Katniss". Sam Lansky for Idolator praised the single's musical departure from Aguilera's ballads for her 2012 album Lotus. Brett Malec of E! simply called it "a beautiful track", while a staff writer from Billboard named it a "triumphant" song. While reviewing the soundtrack for The Hunger Games: Catching Fire, Alex Young from Consequence of Sound selected "We Remain" as one of the highlights from the album, which made Aguilera "the biggest star on display". Entertainment Weekly writer Nick Catucci picked it as one of the best tracks, calling it "an awesome reminder of Christina's power" and "one of the most righteous doses of uplift this year, on any platform".

Personnel
Credits adapted from The Hunger Games: Catching Fire'' soundtrack digital inlay cover

 Songwriting – Brent Kutzle, Mikky Ekko, Ryan Tedder
 Producing – Brent Kutzle, Ryan Tedder
 Guitar – Aaron Andersen
 Piano – Ryan Tedder
 Strings, bass, drums, piano – Brent Kutzle
 Mixing – Joe Zook
 Assistant mixing – Ryan Lipman
 Mastering – Brian "Big Bass" Gardner
 Engineering – Alex Bush, Bryan Cook, Stuart Schenk
 Assistant engineering – Angelo Caputo

Track listing
Digital download
 "We Remain" – 4:00

Charts
"We Remain" peaked at number 58 on the South Korean Gaon International Download Chart with 2,689 copies sold on October 6, 2013. The single also peaked at number 31 on the Belgian Flanders Singles Chart and number 14 on the Belgian Wallonian Singles Chart.

Release history

Notes

References

2010s ballads
Christina Aguilera songs
2013 singles
The Hunger Games music
Pop ballads
RCA Records singles
Songs written by Ryan Tedder
Songs written by Brent Kutzle
Republic Records singles
Songs written by Mikky Ekko
Universal Music Group singles
Sony Music singles